was a professional baseball player from Japan.  He played for  Chiba Lotte Marines     in the Japan Pacific League and the Yakult Swallows  in the Japan Central League.

References

1968 births
Living people
Baseball people from Fukuoka Prefecture
Japanese baseball players
Nippon Professional Baseball catchers
Lotte Orions players
Chiba Lotte Marines players
Yakult Swallows players